Janice Kulyk Keefer (born 2 June 1952) is a Canadian novelist and poet. Of Ukrainian heritage, Kulyk Keefer often writes about the experiences of first-generation Canadian children of immigrants.

Biography

She was born as Janice Kulyk on 2 June 1952 in Toronto, Ontario. She studied English literature at the University of Toronto, graduating with a BA. She then studied at the University of Sussex, where she received an MPhil and D.Phil. Following this, Keefer became an assistant professor of English studies at Université Sainte-Anne in Pointe-de-l'Église, Nova Scotia. She is a specialist in Modernist literature. In her literary work on Ukrainian-Canadian identity, she "rejects simplified notions of multiculturalism" in preference to a Ukrainian transnational identity. , she is a professor of literature and theatre in the graduate studies department at the University of Guelph in Guelph, Ontario.

Her sister is the Canadian artist, Karen Kulyk and her son is the Decouple Podcast host Dr. Chris Keefer.

Awards and honours
1987 Governor General's Awards, nominated, Under Eastern Eyes
1988 Books in Canada First Novel Award, nominated, Constellations
1996 Governor General's Awards, nominated, The Green Library
1999 Marian Engel Award, lifetime achievement 
2006 Greifswald Canadian Studies Fellow in Residence, University of Greifswald, Germany
2008 Kobzar Literary Award, The Ladies Lending Library

Bibliography
 White of the Lesser Angels (1986)
 The Paris-Napoli Express (1986)
 Transfigurations (1987)
 Under Eastern Eyes: A Critical Reading of Maritime Fiction
 Constellations 
 Reading Mavis Gallant (1989)
 Travelling Ladies (1992)
 Rest Harrow (1992)
 The Green Library 
 Marrying the Sea (1998)
 Kyiv, of Two Lands: New Visions (1998, anthology co-edited with Solemea Pavlychko)
 Honey and Ashes: A Story of Family (1998)
 The Waste Zone (2002)
 Thieves (2004) 
 The Ladies' Lending Library (2007)
 Foreign Relations (2010)

References

Further reading

External links
 Interview, online from CBC Words at Large
 Janice Kulyk Keeper at writerscafe.ca
 The author at English-Canadian Writers, Athabasca University, by Deborah Saidero, University of Udine, 2016

1952 births
20th-century Canadian novelists
20th-century Canadian poets
21st-century Canadian novelists
21st-century Canadian poets
Canadian women poets
Canadian women novelists
Canadian people of Ukrainian descent
Living people
Writers from Toronto
Academic staff of the University of Greifswald
Canadian women academics
German women academics
Academic staff of the University of Guelph
20th-century Canadian women writers
21st-century Canadian women writers